Cavell was originally the name of a township in East Riding of Yorkshire.  Its meaning was taken from Old English 'Cafeld' meaning a 'field of jackdaws'.  In the Domesday Book it is spelt in a Norman variant as 'Cheuede', but later developed into Cavil.  The Pipe Rolls record Thomas de Kauill in 1190 living in Yorkshire.  Robert de Cavilla appears in the Hundred Rolls of Lincolnshire the following century.  By the early modern period the name is also spelt Cavell and Cavill.

Notable people with the name include:

Given name
Cavell Brownie, American statistician
Gordon Cavell Johnson (born 1985), known professionally as Cavell Johnson, American basketball player and coach

Surname 
Edith Cavell (1865–1915), British First-World-War nurse and spy
Humphrey Cavell, 16th-century Member of Parliament
John Cavell (1813–1887), British department store proprietor and mayor of Oxford, England
John Cavell (bishop) (1916–2017), British Anglican cleric, Bishop of Southampton
Kingsley Cavell (born 1953), British chemist, professor of inorganic chemistry and head of the school of chemistry at Cardiff University
 Marc Cavell (actor) (1939–2004), American actor
 Marc Cavell (artist) (1911–1989), British kinetic artist
Stanley Cavell (1926–2018), American writer and philosopher

Fictional characters 

 Mark Cavell, in The Man from the Alamo

See also
 Cavell (disambiguation)

References